National Tertiary Route 304, or just Route 304 (or ) is a National Road Route of Costa Rica, located in the San José, Cartago provinces.

Description
In San José province the route covers Desamparados canton (San Miguel, Rosario districts), Aserrí canton (Salitrillos district).

In Cartago province the route covers Cartago canton (Corralillo district).

References

Highways in Costa Rica